See:
Parties in the European Council between January and April 2004
Parties in the European Council between May and December 2004